The M118 is an air-dropped general-purpose or demolition bomb used by United States military forces. It dates back to the time of the Korean War of the early 1950s. This is a higher percentage than in the more recent American Mark 80 series bombs thus perhaps the designation as a demolition bomb.

In the late 1950s through the early 1970s it was a standard aircraft weapon, carried by the F-100 Super Sabre, F-104 Starfighter, F-105 Thunderchief, and F-4 Phantom. Some apparently remain in the USAF inventory, although they are rarely used today.

It was a component of the GBU-9/B version of the Rockwell electro-optically guided Homing Bomb System (HOBOS). This weapon consisted of a M-118 fitted with a KMU-390/B guidance kit with an image contrast seeker, strakes and cruciform tail fins to guide the bomb to its target. It was also used in the Texas Instruments Paveway I series of laser-guided bombs as the GBU-11 when it was fitted with the KMU-388 seeker head, MAU-157 Computer Control Group and the MXU-602 Airfoil Group. This latter consisted of four fixed cruciform fins and four moveable canards to control the bomb's trajectory. It was also fitted with an AIM-9B Sidewinder infra-red seeker and an AGM-45 Shrike nose cone during 1967 tests at the Naval Ordnance Test Station China Lake, presumably in an attempt to create an infra-red guided bomb. This was called the Bombwinder.

Notes

References
 Arsenal of Democracy II, Tom Gervasi, 
webpage on the HOBOS
webpage on the Paveway I family of laser-guided bombs

Cold War aerial bombs of the United States
Military equipment introduced in the 1950s